The Indian locomotive class WL of 1939 was a class of  "Pacific"-type steam locomotives used on  broad gauge lines in British India, and then in post-partition Pakistan.

Classes 
The four members of the class were built for the North Western Railway (of British India) by Vulcan Foundry in Newton-le-Willows, Lancashire, England, in 1939, and were delivered the following year.  Upon the partition of India in 1947, they all went to Pakistan.

The class WL of 1939 is not to be confused with the Indian locomotive class WL of 1955, the first ten members of which were also built by Vulcan Foundry.  According to Vulcan Foundry's publicity material, the two classes bore no resemblance to each other.

See also

Rail transport in India#History
History of rail transport in Pakistan
Locomotives of India
Pakistan Railways

References

Notes

Bibliography

External links

 – features a works photo of a class WL (1939) locomotive

Railway locomotives introduced in 1940
WL (1939)
WL
Vulcan Foundry locomotives
4-6-2 locomotives
5 ft 6 in gauge locomotives
Passenger locomotives
Scrapped locomotives